Nam Ki-won (born 26 May 1966) is a South Korean para table tennis player. He won a bronze medal at the 2016 Summer Paralympics.

He had a spinal cord injury during a traffic accident in 1996 and stayed in bed for fifteen years until 2011.

References

1966 births
Living people
Table tennis players at the 2016 Summer Paralympics
Table tennis players at the 2020 Summer Paralympics
Medalists at the 2016 Summer Paralympics
Medalists at the 2020 Summer Paralympics
South Korean male table tennis players
Paralympic bronze medalists for South Korea
Paralympic table tennis players of South Korea
People from Boryeong
Paralympic medalists in table tennis
Sportspeople from South Chungcheong Province
People with paraplegia